The Ligue de soccer élite du Québec is the top amateur league in Quebec, operating at a level below the semi-professional Première Ligue de soccer du Québec.  It operates a number of youth and gender specific divisions and is operated by the Fédération du Soccer du Québec.

The senior men's division is composed of a 1st Division and 2nd Division.  There is promotion and relegation between division 1 and 2, between division 2 and regional AA leagues. The senior female division consists of a single division.

History
Soccer in Quebec before the formation of the LSEQ was spread between various different senior and junior leagues throughout the province. In 1992, the different rival leagues such as the LMSJQ, LMSSQ and Quebec National Soccer League (LNSQ) merged in order to form the Ligue de soccer élite du Québec (LSEQ). The league was initially structured with two divisions with a promotion and relegation system with Ira Turetsky as the inaugural league president. In 1993, five of the former LNSQ clubs Corfinium St-Leonard, Cosmos de LaSalle, Luso Stars Mont-Royal, Montreal Croatia, and Montreal Ramblers joined the Canadian National Soccer League (CNSL) to form the league's Eastern Division.

Organization
The senior men's division is composed of a 1st Division and 2nd Division.  There is promotion and relegation between division 1 and 2, between division 2 and regional AA leagues. The senior female division consists of a single division. The league also runs, U-15, U-16, U-17, U-18, U-19, and U-21 divisions for both genders. The season runs from early May to late September, and is followed by playoffs that take place in October, which determine the Quebec champion for each division. Promotion and relegation exists between the various divisions.

The caliber of the LSÉQ is identified as "AAA", that is to say the highest level in Quebec. The "AA" caliber corresponds to regional leagues, and the "A" caliber to recreational or local leagues.

Champions

 2006 Sélect de Trois-Rivières
 2007 Corfinium AFA St-Léonard
 2009 Royal-Sélect Beauport
 2010 Royal-Sélect Beauport
 2011 Corfinium St-Léonard

 2012 Royal-Sélect Beauport
 2013 Royal-Sélect Beauport
 2014 Étoiles de l'Est
 2015 Rapides de Chaudière-Ouest
 2016 Panellinios

 2017 Royal-Sélect Beauport
 2018 Celtix du Haut-Richelieu
 2019 Kodiak Charlesbourg
 2020 CS Panellinios
 2021 Boucherville

References

External links 

Rules
Quebec League stats page
2011 Guide
2011 Quebec Cup Guide

Soccer leagues in Quebec
1992 establishments in Quebec
Sports leagues established in 1992